In Canada, there are two types of sales taxes levied. These are :
Provincial sales taxes (PST), levied by the provinces.  
Goods and services tax (GST)/harmonized sales tax (HST), a value-added tax levied by the federal government.  The GST applies nationally.  The HST includes the provincial portion of the sales tax but is administered by the Canada Revenue Agency (CRA) and is applied under the same legislation as the GST.  The HST is in effect in Ontario, New Brunswick,  Newfoundland and Labrador, Nova Scotia and Prince Edward Island.

Every province except Alberta has implemented either a provincial sales tax or the Harmonized Sales Tax. The federal GST rate is 5 percent, effective January 1, 2008.

The territories of Yukon, Northwest Territories, and Nunavut have no territorial sales taxes, so only the GST is collected. The three northern jurisdictions are heavily subsidized by the federal government, and their residents receive some additional tax concessions due to the high cost of living in the north.

Provincial sales taxes

Separate provincial sales taxes (PST) are collected in the provinces of British Columbia, Saskatchewan, Manitoba (retail sales tax or RST) and Quebec (Quebec sales tax or QST, French: Taxe de vente du Québec or TVQ).  Prince Edward Island switched to a HST on April 1, 2013, the same date that British Columbia reverted to a separate GST/PST after their adoption of a HST in 2010 was rejected in a referendum. Goods to which the tax is applied vary by province, as does the rate. In all provinces where the provincial sales tax is collected, the tax is imposed on the sale price without GST (in the past, in Quebec and in Prince Edward Island, PST was applied to the combined sum of sale price and GST). Of the provincial sales taxes, only the QST (and the HST) are value-added; the rest are cascading taxes.

New housing rebate 
Sales taxes on new or significantly renovated housing used as a primary residence may be eligible to have a portion of charged federal and provincial sales taxes rebated. New homes valued up to $450,000 may be eligible for a 36% rebate on GST charged up to a maximum of $6,300. Provincial sales tax rebate programs on new housing are offered in Ontario, British Columbia, Nova Scotia, Saskatchewan, and Quebec (for QST). Terms and conditions vary by province.

References

Further reading
 Bird, R. M. (2012). The GST/HST: Creating an Integrated Sales Tax in a Federal Country. Rotman School of Management Working Paper, (2115620).

External links

 GST/HST rates table at the Canada Revenue Agency
 Government of British Columbia: Sales Taxes
 Revenu Quebec website
 Revenu Québec (General Information Concerning the QST and the GST/HST

Taxation in Canada
Sales taxes